Juan María Aubriot (1876–1930) was a Uruguayan architect.

Some of his most important buildings are:
School of Law, University of the Republic
Residencia de Suárez
Edificio Lapido

References

1876 births
1930 deaths
Uruguayan people of French descent
University of the Republic (Uruguay) alumni
Uruguayan architects